Lingerie is fashionable and notionally alluring undergarments.

Lingerie may also refer to:

 Lingerie (TV series), a softcore television series
 Lingerie (film), a 1928 American silent war drama film
 Emmanuel "Lingerie" DeAnda, singer with Pretty Ricky
 "Lingerie", a song by Lizzo from Cuz I Love You, 2019